The 1956 Ukrainian Cup was a football knockout competition conducting by the Football Federation of the Ukrainian SSR and was known as the Ukrainian Cup.

Teams

Non-participating teams 
The Ukrainian teams of masters did not take part in the competition.
 1956 Soviet Class A (2): FC Dynamo Kyiv, FC Shakhtar Stalino
 1956 Soviet Class B (8): FC Metalurh Zaporizhia, ODO Lvov, ODO Kyiv, FC Avanhard Kharkiv, FC Spartak Stanislav, FC Spartak Uzhhorod, FC Metalurh Dnipropetrovsk, FC Kharchovyk Odesa

Competition schedule

First elimination round

Second elimination round

Quarterfinals

Semifinals

Final 
The final was held in Kyiv.

Top goalscorers

See also 
 Soviet Cup
 Ukrainian Cup

Notes

References

External links 
 Information source 

1956
Cup
1956 domestic association football cups